Ordinary Girl may refer to:

 "Ordinary Girl" (Alison Moyet song)
 "Ordinary Girl" (Bic Runga song)
 "Ordinary Girl" (Earshot song)
 "Ordinary Girl" (Hannah Montana song)
 "Ordinary Girl" (Mike + The Mechanics song)
 "Ordinary Girl" (Vice Squad song from their 2009 album London Underground)
 "Ordinary Girl", performed by China Forbes, the opening theme for the TV series Clueless
 Ordinary Girl? a 2018 EP by The Featherz and its title track